5F-MPMI is a tryptamine derivative which acts as a serotonin receptor agonist, selective for the 5-HT2 subtypes but with similar affinity to all three receptors, having strongest activity at 5-HT2B and weakest at 5-HT2A.

See also 
 4-HO-MPMI
 5-MeO-MPMI
 MPMI

References 

Designer drugs
Psychedelic tryptamines
Serotonin receptor agonists
Tryptamines
Pyrrolidines
Fluoroarenes